The term gypsy moth originally means the moth Lymantria dispar. It may also refer to:

Gypsy Moth:
Skein (comics), a Marvel Comics character formerly known as Gypsy Moth

Gipsy Moth:
The de Havilland DH.60 Moth, a light aircraft from 1925
Gipsy Moth IV, a yacht sailed round the world by Sir Francis Chichester
Gipsy Moth II, and III, this yacht's predecessors (Gipsy Moth I was an aeroplane.)

See also
 The Gypsy Moths, a 1969 American drama film